American English idioms
Dodge City, Kansas